The Pechora pipit (Anthus gustavi) is a small passerine bird which breeds in the East Palearctic tundra and densely vegetated areas near river banks ranges from the Pechora River to the Chukchi Peninsula. It also breeds in Kamchatka and the Commander Islands. It is a long-distance migrant, moving in winter to Indonesia. Rarely in September and October, the Pechora pipit may be observed in western Europe. The species was first described by Robert Swinhoe in 1863.

Description
A. gustavi is a small pipit, which somewhat resembles the non-breeding red-throated pipit. The species is heavily streaked brown above, with whitish mantle stripes, and with black markings on a white belly and buff breast below. It can be distinguished from red-throated by its heavier bill, whiter mantle stripes, and contrast between its buff breast and white belly.

This species creeps in long grass, and is reluctant to fly even when disturbed. Its call is a distinctive electrical zip. Although the call is generally helpful when identifying pipits, this species calls far less than most. This, combined with its skulking habits, makes this a difficult species to find and identify away from its breeding grounds in the Arctic.

Probably the best place in western Europe to see this rare species is Fair Isle, Shetland. The lack of cover on this small island makes skulking passerines easier to find.

The breeding habitat is damp tundra, open forest or marshland. The nest is on the ground, with four or five eggs being laid. This species is insectivorous, like its relatives.

Etymology

The genus name Anthus is from Latin and is the name for a small bird of grasslands. The specific gustavi commemorates the Dutch naturalist Gustaaf Schlegel.

The English name is derived from the Pechora River in northwest Russia.

References

Pechora pipit
Birds of Russia
Birds of East Asia
Pechora pipit
Pechora pipit